Edward Roberts (born 1 July 1903, date of death unknown) was a South African cricketer who appeared in nine first-class matches for Orange Free State in the 1920s.

References
Edward Roberts from CricketArchive
Edward Robert's profile at CricInfo.com

South African cricketers
Free State cricketers
1903 births
Year of death missing